In English law, an estover is an allowance made to a person out of an estate, or other thing, for his or her support. The word estover can also mean specifically an allowance of wood that a tenant is allowed to take from the commons, for life or a period of years, for the implements of husbandry, hedges and fences, and for firewood.

History
The word derives from the French estover, estovoir, a verb used as a substantive meaning "that which is necessary". This word is of disputed origin; it has been referred to the Latin stare, to stand, or studere, to desire.

The Old English word for estover was bote or boot, also spelled bot or bót, (literally meaning 'good' or 'profit' and cognate with the word better). The various kinds of estovers were known as house-bote, cart or plough-bote, hedge or hay-bote, and fire-bote. Anglo-Saxon law also imposed "bot" fines in the modern sense of compensation. These rights might be restricted by express covenants. Copyholders had similar rights over the land they occupied and over the waste of the manor, in which case the rights are known as Commons of estovers.

Burrill in his dated A law dictionary and glossary published in New York (1871) states:

See also
Condonation
Collegatary
Contorts

Notes

References

 

English legal terminology
Wood
English forest law